The United Arab Emirates Army is the land force branch of the United Arab Emirates Armed Forces.

History

From January 1993 to April 1994, UAE Armed Forces participated in humanitarian operations in Somalia under the United Task Force (UNITAF) and UN Operation in Somalia II (UNOSOM II). UAE land forces supplied a 640-man group in four rotations during this period.

UAE and its Land Forces participated in the NATO-led International Security Assistance Force (ISAF) mission (2001-2014) and committed to contribute to the follow-on mission of ISAF; the Operation Resolute Support.

During the 2015 Yemeni Civil War the United Arab Emirates Army (together with other GCC soldiers) intervened in support of fighters loyal to the ousted regime of Abd Rabbuh Mansur Hadi against Houthi militants. UAE troops assisted anti-Houthi fighters in the re-taking of Aden and Al Anad Air Base. On 4 September 2015 the army lost 52 soldiers in war in Yemen to a tactical ballistic missile strike. UAE has since deployed an entire armoured brigade to Yemen. Up until November 2017 the UAE forces have had 120 dead. On 3 May 2018, UAE deployed over 100 troops, artillery and armoured vehicles to the Yemeni archipelago of Socotra in Arabian Sea without prior coordination with the Government of Yemen. After landing, UAE forces expelled Yemeni soldiers stationed at some installations, including Socotra Airport and the flag of United Arab Emirates was raised above some government buildings in Hadibu.

Equipment

Structure

There are 8 brigades and 1 battalion within the Union land forces of the UAE:

 Royal Guard Brigade
 2 Armored Brigades
 3 Mechanized Infantry Brigades
 2 Infantry Brigade
 Artillery Battalion  (3 Regiments)

Two additional Mechanized Infantry Brigades are stationed in Dubai but are not included in the Union force structure.

Further reading 

 The Evolution of the Armed Forces of the United Arab Emirates by Athol Yates

References

External links
The Evolution of the Armed Forces of the United Arab Emirates by Athol Yates
Ministry of Defence Web Site Arabic and English
Official government.ae page

 
United Arab Emirates